Humaira Bano is Pakistani actress. She is known for her roles in Mere Humdam, Deewangi, Ishq Zahe Naseeb and Jhoot.

Early life
Humaira was born on December 17th, 1971 in Islamabad, Pakistan. She completed her studies from University of Islamabad.

Career
She joined the industry in 2004. She was also noted for her roles in dramas Aik Thi Rania, Bholi Bano, Jugnoo and Aas. She is known for her work in dramas Mere Humdam, Mehar Posh, Ishq Zahe Naseeb and Phir Wohi Mohabbat.

Personal life
Humaira is divorced and has one son.

Filmography

Television

Telefilm

Film

References

External links
 
 

1971 births
Living people
Pakistani television actresses
21st-century Pakistani actresses
Pakistani film actresses